Kjell Ola Dahl (born 4 February 1958) is a Norwegian writer, who is sometimes known professionally as K. O. Dahl.

His writing career began with the publishing of Dødens Investeringer (Lethal Investments) in 1993 and he has subsequently authored more than a dozen novels, many short stories, several non-fiction books, and co-written two screenplays with the writer/director Hisham Zaman.

He is best known for his eleven Nordic noir crime novels which feature his Oslo detectives Frølich and Gunnarstranda. Six of these have been published in English, translated by Don Bartlett.

Speaking of his own work in Nordic Noir Dahl says ‘I’m never entirely satisfied with my work – I’m pleased, of course, that readers find things to enjoy in them, but I can always see their weaknesses all too clearly'''.

 Bibliography 

In English

Translated by Don Bartlett.

 The Fourth Man (2007)
 The Man in the Window (2008)
 The Last Fix (2009)
 Lethal Investments (2011)
 The Courier (2015)
 Faithless (2017)
 The Ice Swimmer (2018)

In NorwegianDødens investeringer (1993) – Lethal InvestmentsSeksognitti (1994)Miniatyren (1996)Siste skygge av tvil (1998)En liten gyllen ring (2000) – The Last FixMannen i vinduet (2001) – The Man in the WindowGjensynsgleder - love stories (2002) Lille tambur (2003)Venezia – forfatterens guide (2004) – a travel guideDen fjerde raneren (2005) – The Fourth ManLindeman & Sachs (2006)Svart engel (2007)Lindemans tivoli (2008)Kvinnen i plast (2010) – FaithlessIsbaderen (2011) – The Ice SwimmerKureren'' (2015)

Screenplays
Vinterland (2007)
Før Snøen Faller (2013)

References

External links 
 Mini blog by K.O.Dahl (in English)

1958 births
Living people
Norwegian male novelists
Norwegian crime fiction writers
Norwegian mystery writers
Norwegian non-fiction writers
Norwegian male short story writers
20th-century Norwegian short story writers
21st-century Norwegian short story writers
20th-century Norwegian novelists
21st-century Norwegian novelists
20th-century Norwegian male writers
21st-century Norwegian male writers
Nordic Noir writers
Male non-fiction writers